The  are a group of 13 Buddhist sacred sites in Nara Prefecture. Yamato was a former province of Japan corresponding to today's Nara Prefecture. The majority of the temples in this grouping are part of Japanese esoteric Shingon Buddhism.

Directory

See also
 Thirteen Buddhas

External links
 Official website

Buddhist temples in Nara Prefecture
Buddhist pilgrimage sites in Japan